This is a list of Norwegian World War II aircraft. This list will show all the aircraft in use by the Norwegian Army Air Service(normal aircraft) and Royal Norwegian Navy Air Service(naval aircraft) during the Norwegian campaign or the World War II invasion of Norway by Nazi Germany. If anyone wishes to apply aircraft used by Little Norway please put them under a different header to differentiate them.

Fighters 

 Armstrong Whitworth Scimitar(non-operational)
 Gloster Gladiator
 Curtiss P-36 Hawk(non-operational)

Bombers 

 Fokker C.V

Torpedo bombers 

 Douglas DT
 Heinkel He 115

Reconnaissance 

 Caproni Ca.310

Naval reconnaissance 

 Marinens Flyvebaatfabrikk M.F.11
 Breda Ba.28(variant of Ba.25)
 Arado Ar 196(1 captured in invasion)

Trainers 

 De Havilland DH.60 Moth
 De Havilland Tiger Moth

Naval trainers 

 Marinens Flyvebaatfabrikk M.F.10

References

Norwegian Army Air Service
Norway